The 2014 Copa del Sol took place in La Manga and Pinatar (Region of Murcia, Spain) between 27 January and 6 February 2014.

Group stage

Tables

Group Blue

Group Red

Round One

Round Two

Round Three

Final

Goalscorers 
2 goals (6 players)

 Constantin Budescu (Astra Giurgiu)
 Daniel Bamberg (Haugesund)
 Pontus Engblom (Haugesund)
 Thomas Lehne Olsen (Strømsgodset)
 John Chibuike (Rosenborg)
 Pål André Helland (Rosenborg)
 Gustav Wikheim (Strømsgodset)

1 goal (31 players)

 Niklas Backman (AIK)
 Nabil Bahoui (AIK)
 Eero Markkanen (AIK)
 Takayuki Seto (Astra Giurgiu)
 Mirko Ivanovski (Astra Giurgiu)
 William Amorim (Astra Giurgiu)
 Abdoul Yoda (Astra Giurgiu)
 Júnior Morais (Astra Giurgiu)
 Yazalde Gomes Pinto (Astra Giurgiu)
 Paul Papp (Astra Giurgiu)
 Massinga (Benfica Luanda)
 Vadim Cemirtan (Costuleni)
 Vladimirs Volkovs (Daugava)
 Maic Sema (Haugesund)
 Christian Gytkjær (Haugesund)
 Daniel Chima Chukwu (Molde)
 Joona Toivio (Molde)
 Eirik Hestad (Molde)
 Tommy Høiland (Molde)
 Even Hovland (Molde)
 Fredrik Gulbrandsen (Molde)
 Alexander Søderlund (Rosenborg)
 Tobias Mikkelsen (Rosenborg)
 Stefan Strandberg (Rosenborg)
 Nicki Bille Nielsen (Rosenborg)
 Péter Kovács (Strømsgodset)
 Tokmac Nguen (Strømsgodset)
 Dennis Sørensen (Vestsjælland)
 Rasmus Festersen (Vestsjælland)
 Jan Kristiansen (Vestsjælland)

References

External links 
 Copa del Sol: Official Page

2014
2013–14 in Romanian football
2013–14 in Moldovan football
2013–14 in Danish football
2014 in Angolan football
2014 in Swedish football
2014 in Norwegian football
2014 in Latvian football